Omalaeti O'Swapo was the only album released by the Namibian political kwaito group Omalaeti O'Swapo (meaning: Swapo juniors).

The group included four musicians – Pablo, The Dogg, Gazza and Elvo – who were among the most popular musicians in Namibia at the time of the group's formation. However, the group was actually formed by the SWAPO party. Elvo handled the production duties, and John Walenga handled management and promotion under the supervision of SWAPO.

The album sold well, especially among SWAPO veterans and supporters, but was not critically successful due to its political influence. After the release of the album, each member went back to their respective solo careers, rarely speaking about Omalaeti O'Swapo.

Political background 

The album's objective was to promote Namibian's 2004 presidential elections. President Hifikepunye Pohamba was the SWAPO presidential candidate after former President Sam Nujoma stepped down. Omalaeti O'Swapo used the album to encourage young people and the Namibian nation at large to take part in the election.

The album's first track, "Presidential Call", is a remake of Gazza's song "Shidolodolo". It features an encouraging speech from both presidents.

Establishment of Omalaeti Music 

After the release and success of the album, its executive John Walenga established a music company, Omalaeti Music. Today, this is one of Namibia's biggest labels and is home to successful selling artists such as Tate But, PDK and DJ Kboz.

Track listing

See also 

SWAPO

References

External links 
Omalaeti Music
Gazza
The Dogg

2004 albums
The Dogg albums
Gazza (musician) albums
Albums produced by Elvo
SWAPO
Namibian music